Good Stuff is the sixth studio album by American new wave band the B-52's, released in 1992 by Reprise Records.

Background
Good Stuff was created in the wake of the departure of B-52's singer and founding member Cindy Wilson, who left the band after an Earth Day performance in Central Park in 1990. The band were just finishing up 18 months of touring, following the massive success of their 1989 album, Cosmic Thing. Wilson would ultimately be absent from the band from 1990 to 1994, taking a hiatus to raise children, and later stated, "My clock was ticking, so I chose to take some time off." Wilson said that another reason for her departure was that she still missed her brother Ricky Wilson, the band's former guitarist who died in 1985, and that she "needed to step back and chill." Fred Schneider recalled, "All of a sudden she just decided she was quitting ... so it was real stressful. It was a real shock." However, the band continued with Wilson's blessing and eventually hired Julee Cruise to tour as a vocalist with the band.

Guitarist Keith Strickland later stated that Good Stuff came about when the band's manager pushed them to quickly come up with a new album to follow up the success of Cosmic Thing, despite them being "burnt out" and "exhausted" from touring. Like Cosmic Thing, Good Stuff was produced jointly by Nile Rodgers and Don Was.

Reception

Commercial
The title track, "Good Stuff", was issued as the lead single and peaked at No. 28 on the Billboard Hot 100, charting for 13 weeks. The album charted for 15 weeks, peaking at No. 16 on the Billboard 200, and went on to be nominated for the Grammy Award for Best Alternative Music Album at the 35th Annual Grammy Awards, losing to Tom Waits's Bone Machine.

Critical
David Browne of Entertainment Weekly felt the album "reduces their sound to a dull formula", and that "their attempts to keep the party going ... sound more forced than ever", although he cited "Revolution Earth" as the highlight. Elysa Gardner of Rolling Stone found the work of the two producers "impressively seamless", citing "Dreamland" and "Bad Influence" as highlights, and added that "Pierson's richly textured vocals hold up just fine on their own" in light of the absence of Cindy Wilson.

In a retrospective review for AllMusic, Stephen Thomas Erlewine thought the title track "was a transparent attempt to recapture the good vibes of 'Love Shack'" that "didn't succeed", but "did have the distinction of being the best single pulled from Good Stuff."

Track listing
All tracks written by the B-52's, except where noted.

"Tell It Like It T-I-Is" – 5:13
"Hot Pants Explosion" – 4:55
"Good Stuff" – 5:58
"Revolution Earth" (Kate Pierson, Keith Strickland, Robert Waldrop) – 5:48
"Dreamland" – 7:35
"Is That You Mo-Dean?" – 5:32
"The World's Green Laughter" (Strickland) – 4:04
"Vision of a Kiss" – 5:57
"Breezin'" – 5:21
"Bad Influence" – 5:41

Personnel
The B-52's
 Kate Pierson – vocals 
 Fred Schneider – vocals (1–6, 8–10)
 Keith Strickland – guitars (1–6, 8–10), vocals (3, 8), keyboards (4–10), drum programming (7)

Additional musicians
 Richard Hilton – acoustic piano (1), keyboards (1, 4–5, 7–8), Synclavier programming (7)
 Pat Irwin – acoustic piano (2), Hammond B3 organ (2), keyboards (3, 6, 10), guitars (10)
 Jamie Muhoberac – keyboards (2–3, 6, 9–10)
 Tracy Wormworth – bass (1, 4–5, 8)
 Nile Rodgers – guitars (8)
 Don Was – guitars (10)
 James "Hutch" Hutchinson – bass (2, 10)
 Sara Lee – bass (3, 6)
 Nicky Brown – bass (9)
 Sterling Campbell – drums (1, 4–5, 8)
 Jeff Porcaro – drums (2, 9–10)
 Zachary Alford – drums (3, 6)
 Lenny Castro – percussion (2–3, 6, 9–10)
 Stephen "Doc" Kupka – baritone saxophone (2, 6)
 Dave McMurray – saxophone (2, 6), flute (9)
 Lee Thornburg – trumpet (2)
 Amy Shulman – harp (6)
 Tawatha Agee – backing vocals (1)
 Michelle Cobbs – backing vocals (1)
 Curtis King – backing vocals (1)
 Fonzi Thornton – backing vocals (1)
 Brenda White-King – backing vocals (1)
 Mo-Dean Intergalactic Choir – choir (6)

Technical
 Nile Rodgers – producer (1, 4–5, 7–8)
 Don Was – producer (2–3, 6, 9–10)
 Tom Durack – mixing, engineer (1, 4–5, 7–8), recording (2–3, 6, 9–10)
 Ed Cherney – recording (2–3, 6, 9–10)
 Jon Goldberger – additional engineer (1, 4–5, 7–8)
 Pat Dillett – additional engineer (2–3, 6, 9–10)
 Rik Pekkonen – additional engineer (2–3, 6, 9–10)
 Victor Deyglio – assistant engineer (1, 4–5, 7–8)
 Hiro Ishihara – assistant engineer (1, 4–5, 7–8)
 Justin Luchter – assistant engineer (1, 4–5, 7–8)
 Dan Bosworth – assistant engineer (2–3, 6, 9–10)
 Brian Pollack – assistant engineer (2–3, 6, 9–10)
 Mike Reither – assistant engineer (2–3, 6, 9–10)
 Scott Hull – digital editing at Masterdisk (New York City, New York)
 Doug Redler – technical coordinator
 Artie Smith – drum technician 
 Bob Ludwig – mastering at Masterdisk (New York City, New York)
 Budd Tunick – production manager (1, 4–5, 7–8)
 Marsha Burns – production coordinator (2–3, 6, 9–10)
 Renoda Campbell-Monza – project coordinator 
 The B-52's – art direction, cover concept 
 Tom Recchion – art direction, design, cover concept 
 Janet Perr – design 
 Cecil Juanarena – computer imaging
 Robert Waldrop – handlettering
 Josef Astor – photography, booklet photography 
 Jay Gullixson – additional photography 
 Charlie Welch – additional photography 
 Laura Levine – booklet photography 
 Robert Molnar – booklet photography 
 Chip Simons – booklet photography 
 Doug Perrine – Manatee photo
 Lady Bunny – PETA photo 
 Joe McDevittt – make-up
 Koko – make-up
 Patti Wilson – stylist 
 Roland Beauchamp – hair stylist 
 Alpina Bowa – clothing designer
 Angel Zimick – clothing designer
 Ted Meuhling – jewelry

Certifications

Chart performance
The album spent 15 weeks on the U.S. Billboard album charts and reached its peak position of No. 16 in July 1992.

References

The B-52's albums
1992 albums
Albums produced by Nile Rodgers
Albums produced by Don Was
Albums produced by Russ Titelman
Reprise Records albums